Nicolò Nicolosi (9 August 1912 – 3 May 1986) was an Italian football player and manager from Lercara Friddi in the Province of Palermo. During his career, Nicolosi played as a forward for Lazio, Napoli and Atalanta in Serie A.

He played for six seasons in Catania Calcio, both in Serie B and Serie C, partaking in over 150 games and was later a manager there for some time.

References

1912 births
1986 deaths
People from Lercara Friddi
Association football forwards
Italian footballers
Catania S.S.D. players
Footballers from Sicily
Atalanta B.C. players
S.S.C. Napoli players
Italian football managers
S.S. Lazio players
Pisa S.C. managers
Palermo F.C. managers
Catania S.S.D. managers
U.S. Salernitana 1919 managers
Serie A players
Serie B players
Serie C players
Sportspeople from the Province of Palermo
Vigevano Calcio players
A.S.D. Nerostellati Frattese players